Lieutenant General Sir Joseph John Talbot Hobbs,  (24 August 1864 – 21 April 1938) was an Australian architect and First World War general.

Early life
Hobbs was born in London, the son of Joseph and his wife Frances Ann Hobbs (née Wilson). Educated at St Mary's church school, Merton, Surrey, Hobbs joined the volunteer artillery in 1883. He also worked as draughtsman for a builder, John Hurst. In 1886, he emigrated with Hurst to Western Australia and established an architectural practice in Perth in 1887.

Hobbs designed many of the well known public buildings in Perth and Fremantle, including the Weld Club, the Savoy Hotel and the Perth Masonic Lodge. Hobbs was treasurer of the Western Australian Institute of Architects in 1896, and later became the institute's president from 1909 to 1911. From 1905, he was senior partner in the firm of architects, Hobbs, Smith & Forbes.

Hobbs also designed a number of private residences. The first of these is believed to be Samson House in Fremantle, an example of late 19th century colonial style, which was built in two stages between 1888 and 1890. The house is registered with the National Trust, and is in the Register of the National Estate.

Military career
In 1887, Hobbs joined the volunteer artillery in Perth as a gunner, was commissioned in 1889, and rose to the command of the 1st (Western Australian) Field Battery in 1903. In 1906 he was a lieutenant colonel commanding a Western Australian mixed brigade, and in 1913 a colonel commanding the 22nd Infantry Brigade. On four occasions he went to England and did intensive courses in artillery training with the British Army. He was thus thoroughly equipped when war broke out and, on 8 August 1914 was selected by Major General William Bridges to command the 1st Australian Divisional Artillery.

After training in Egypt, he was at the landing at Gallipoli on 25 April 1915 and was soon ashore searching for positions for his guns. Hobbs clashed with Bridges over the placement of the guns. Hobbs was in command of the artillery until 9 November 1915 when he was struck down with dysentery and invalided to Cairo despite his protests.

Hobbs was then promoted brigadier general and made a Companion of the Order of the Bath. In March 1916 he went with the 1st Australian Division to France, and was in command of the Australian artillery when Pozières was captured. In December 1916 he assumed command of the 5th Australian Division and was made a major general in January. This division was in the thick of the fighting in the spring of 1917, and in September distinguished itself at Polygon Wood. The staff worked well together, and achieved a great victory. Hobbs was created both a Knight Commander of the Order of the Bath and Knight Commander of the Order of St Michael and St George on 1 January 1918. At the end of April his division fought at the Second Battle of Villers-Bretonneux, which probably contributed to the abandonment of the German operations towards Amiens.

Towards the end of May, Lieutenant General Sir John Monash was placed in command of the Australian Corps, and Hobbs became the senior divisional commander in the corps. His division was then given a well-earned rest but took a share in the great counterattack which began on 8 August. It did not take a leading part in the capture of Mont St Quentin, but Monash, in his The Australian Victories in France, stated that he was "concerned ... that the fine performance of the Fifth Division should not be underrated. The circumstances under which general Hobbs was called upon to intervene in the battle, at very short notice, imposed upon him, personally, difficulties of no mean order". One of his tasks it may be mentioned was the crossing of the Somme in the face of strong opposition, and when Hobbs sent a message to the men of his war-worn division on its beginning a rest period on 8 September, he was able to say that they had "earned imperishable fame for their gallantry and valour". It was but a short rest, for they were in the line again later on in the same month, and Hobbs was making careful plans for the attack on the Hindenburg line which was successfully breached by the 3rd and 5th divisions on 30 September and 1 October. Monash was put in charge of the repatriation and demobilisation of the Australian troops, and Hobbs succeeded him in the command of the Australian Corps until May 1919.

Post-war
After the Armistice, Hobbs decided to return to his former profession; architecture. With a keen interest in the construction of war memorials, Hobbs was responsible for designing the Western Australian War Memorial in Kings Park, Perth, St George's College, Crawley and the Temperance and General and Royal Insurance buildings.

Hobbs died at sea of a heart attack while en route to the unveiling of the Villers–Bretonneux Australian National Memorial, built to the design of English architect Sir Edwin Lutyens.

Legacy

Hobbs was a short and slight man, whose civilian life was that of a successful citizen who had a full realisation of his responsibilities to the society of which he was a member. Hobbs was capable, self-sacrificing and measured his life by high standards. Monash said of Hobbs that he "succeeded fully as the Commander of a Division by his sound common sense and his sane attitude towards every problem that confronted him". The eulogy of Lieutenant General Sir Brudenell White was "he was not only a soldier, he was also a great citizen, and a great Christian gentleman ... who knew none other than the straight path".

The Lieut. General Sir J. J. Talbot Hobbs Memorial, better known as the Talbot Hobbs memorial, was proposed and constructed just prior to the Second World War. The memorial is made of Donnybrook stone with a bronze bust of Hobbs on top, and placed against a background of Canary Island Palms on the Perth Esplanade. Since it was built the memorial has been the receiving point for the salute during Anzac Day parade, it was also the location from where Queen Elizabeth II took the salute during the 1954 Royal visit. The memorial was placed on the Western Australian Heritage register on 18 March 2005.

The memorial was moved in 2014 from the Perth Esplanade to the Supreme Court Gardens as part of works to create Elizabeth Quay.

See also
 List of buildings designed by Talbot Hobbs

Notes

Further reading

External links

 Digger History
 General Officers of the 1st AIF: Talbot Hobbs
 
 
 Defence Magazine Issue 8 2007/08

1864 births
1938 deaths
Architects from Western Australia
Australian generals
Australian Knights Commander of the Order of St Michael and St George
Australian Knights Commander of the Order of the Bath
Australian military personnel of World War I
Settlers of Western Australia
English emigrants to Australia
Federation architects
Military personnel from London
People who died at sea
Recipients of the Croix de Guerre 1914–1918 (France)
Royal Artillery soldiers